This is a list of diseases of cattleya (Cattleya spp.).

Bacterial diseases

Fungal diseases

Viral and viroid diseases

Miscellaneous diseases and disorders

References 

 Common Names of Diseases, The American Phytopathological Society

Cattleya
Cattleya